The Co-cathedral of Saint Mary is the cathedral of Castelló de la Plana, located in the comarca of Plana Alta, in the Valencian Community, Spain.

References

External links 

 Diocese of Segorbe-Castelló
 Co-cathedral website
 Co-cathedral at Campaners.com

Castelló